Oscar Sorto (born August 8, 1994) is an American professional soccer player.

Career

Professional
Sorto grew up playing in the U.S. Soccer Development Academy for the Pateadores and LA Galaxy. On April 16, 2012, Sorto signed a letter of intent to play college soccer at California State University, Bakersfield.  However, on December 11, he elected to pursue a professional contract and he signed with Los Angeles Galaxy as a homegrown player. On September 25, 2013, Sorto made his professional debut in a 3–0 victory over Costa Rican side Cartaginés in the CONCACAF Champions League.

International
On May 20, 2013, Sorto was named to the 22-man squad for the 2013 Toulon Tournament where he would make one appearance for the U.S. under-20 national team on June 5 in a 1–0 loss to South Korea.  Two days later, Sorto was named to the 21-man squad for the 2013 FIFA U-20 World Cup in Turkey where he made two appearances, one against France and one against Ghana.

He is also eligible to represent El Salvador due to having Salvadoran-born parents, and was called up to represent El Salvador for the first time on September 29, 2017.

Honors
LA Galaxy
MLS Cup: 2014

References

External links

U.S. U20 bio
Profile @ TopDrawerSoccer.com

1994 births
Living people
American soccer players
Homegrown Players (MLS)
LA Galaxy players
LA Galaxy II players
Orange County SC players
Association football defenders
Soccer players from California
USL Championship players
Major League Soccer players
United States men's under-20 international soccer players
United States men's under-23 international soccer players
American sportspeople of Salvadoran descent
United Premier Soccer League players